The 20-meter or 14-MHz amateur radio band is a portion of the shortwave radio spectrum, comprising frequencies stretching from 14.000 MHz to 14.350 MHz. The 20-meter band is widely considered among the best for long-distance communication (DXing), and is one of the most popular—and crowded—during contests. Several factors contribute to this, including the band's large size, the relatively small size of antennas tuned to it (especially as compared to antennas for the 40-meter band or the 80-meter band) and its good potential for daytime DX operation even in unfavorable propagation conditions.

History 

The Third National Radio Conference was responsible for opening up the 20-meter band to amateur radio operators in the US on October 10, 1924. The band was allocated on a worldwide basis by the International Radiotelegraph Conference in
Washington, D.C., on October 4, 1927. Its frequency allocation was then 14–14.4 MHz.  The allocation was reduced to 14–14.35 MHz by the International Radio Conference of Atlantic City, New Jersey 1947.

Band plans

IARU Region 1 
Europe, Africa, Middle East and Northern Asia

IARU Region 2 
The Americas

IARU Region 3 
Asia-Pacific

United States 
Effective 12:01 a.m. EST, February 23, 2007

Canada 
Canada is part of region 2 and as such is subject to the IARU band plan. Radio Amateurs of Canada offers the bandplan below as a recommendation for use by radio amateurs in that country but it does not have the force of law and should only be considered a suggestion or guideline.

Key

References

Amateur radio bands